Taroo is a village in the Leh district of Ladakh, India. It is located in the Likir tehsil.

Demographics
According to the 2011 census of India, Taroo has 71 households. The effective literacy rate (i.e. the literacy rate of population excluding children aged 6 and below) is 70.03%.

References 

Villages in Likir tehsil